Micheline Lanctôt (born May 12, 1947) is a Canadian actress, film director, screenwriter, and musician.

Biography
Lanctôt was born in Frelighsburg, Quebec. Her post-secondary education was in music, fine arts, and theatre at Collège Jésus-Marie in Outremont, and in art history at the Université de Montréal and the École des Beaux-Arts de Montréal; she later studied film animation at the National Film Board of Canada (NFB) and then at Gerald Potterton's studios, Potterton Productions, where she remained for four years.

Lanctôt began her acting career in 1972, winning a Canadian Film Award for Best Actress for her starring role in Gilles Carle's The True Nature of Bernadette (La vraie nature de Bernadette). Since then, she has appeared in a wide variety of film and television roles, such as Carle's The Heavenly Bodies (Les Corps Célestes), Ted Kotcheff's award-winning The Apprenticeship of Duddy Kravitz, Claude Chabrol's Blood Relatives and Guy Fournier's Radio-Canada TV series Jamais deux sans toi.

She has directed for the theatre also, directing Oleanna by David Mamet for the Théâtre de Quat'Sous in Montreal in 1994, and in 1999, Bousille et les justes by Gratien Gélinas for the Théâtre du Rideau Vert.

She began her live-action film-directing career with The Handyman (L'Homme à tout faire) (1980), nominated for best direction and for best film at the Genie Awards in 1981. This success was followed by Sonatine (1984), which launched the career of Pascale Bussières and won both the Genie Award for Best Director at the 6th Genie Awards in 1985, and the now-defunct Silver Lion for Best First Film (1983-1987) at the 41st Venice International Film Festival.

Since 1982, Lanctôt has been a part-time instructor in the Mel Hoppenheim School of Cinema at Concordia University.

Lanctôt defended Gaétan Soucy's novel The Little Girl Who Was Too Fond of Matches (La petite fille qui aimait trop les allumettes) in the 2004 edition of Le Combat des livres, broadcast on Première Chaîne.

In 2016 she was the curator of the Festival Vues dans la tête de... film festival in Rivière-du-Loup. She is also a matron of the Prix collégial du cinéma québécois, an annual program engaging film studies students in Quebec CEGEPs to present an award for the year's best Quebec film.

Awards and recognition
Winner of an Etrog (now known as Genie), best performance by a lead actress (1972)
Winner of the Genie, best achievement in direction, for Sonatine (1984)
Winner of the Silver Lion, Venice Film Festival for best first work, Sonatine (1984)
Recipient of the Governor General's Performing Arts Award for Lifetime Artistic Achievement (2003)

Filmography

As an actor

Cinema

 The True Nature of Bernadette (La Vraie nature de Bernadette) - 1972
 The Heavenly Bodies (Les Corps célestes) - 1973
 Noël et Juliette - 1973
 Souris, tu m'inquiètes - 1973
 Voyage to Grand Tartarie (Voyage en Grande Tartarie) - 1974
 The Apprenticeship of Duddy Kravitz - 1974
 Child Under a Leaf - 1974
 Little Tougas (Ti-Cul Tougas) - 1976
 Blood Relatives (Les Liens du sang) - 1978
 Blood and Guts - 1978
 A Scream from Silence (Mourir à tue-tête) - 1979
 The Coffin Affair (L'Affaire Coffin) - 1980
 L'Oreille d'un sourd - 1996
 Heads or Tails (J'en suis!) - 1997
 The Revenge of the Woman in Black (La Vengeance de la femme en noir) - 1997

 Streetheart (Le Coeur au poing) - 1998
 Now or Never (Aujourd'hui ou jamais) - 1998
 The Long Winter (Quand je serai parti... vous vivrez encore) - 1999
 Le Petit ciel - 1999
 Women Without Wings - 2002
 How My Mother Gave Birth to Me During Menopause (Comment ma mère accoucha de moi durant sa ménopause) - 2003
 The Barbarian Invasions (Les Invasions barbares) - 2003
 Children of the Setting Suns - 2003
 A Year in the Death of Jack Richards - 2004
 Familia - 2004
 Good Neighbours - 2010
 Sarah Prefers to Run (Sarah préfère la course) - 2013
 Laughter (Le Rire) - 2020
 Family Game (Arsenault et fils) - 2022
 Frontiers (Frontières) - 2023

Television

  - 1977, 1996
  - 1996
  - 1998
 Le Pollock - 1999
 Tag (2000)

  - 2002
  - 2004
  - 2004
 Tripping the Wire: A Stephen Tree Mystery - 2005
  - 2012-2015
 The Disappearance - 2017

As a director 

Cinema

 A Token Gesture - 1975
 The Handyman (L'Homme à tout faire) - 1980
 Sonatine - 1984
 The Pursuit of Happiness (La Poursuite du bonheur) - 1987
 Onzième spéciale - 1988
 Two Can Play (Deux actrices) - 1993
 A Hero's Life (La Vie d'un héros) - 1994
 
 Juniper Tree (Le Piège d'Issoudun) - 2003
 Suzie - 2009
 For the Love of God (Pour l'amour de Dieu) - 2011
 The Handout (Autrui) - 2015
 9 (9, le film) - 2016
 A Way of Life (Une manière de vivre) - 2019

Television
 Eve (2003)
 The Stones (2004)
 Les Guerriers (2004)

As a writer

Cinema
 The Handyman (L'Homme à tout faire) - 1980
 Sonatine 1984
 The Heat Line (La ligne de chaleur) - 1988
 Two Can Play (Deux actrices) - 1993
 A Hero's Life (La Vie d'un héros) - 1994
 Juniper Tree (Le Piège d'Issoudun) - 2003

Television
 Les Guerriers'' (2004)

References

External links

1947 births
Actresses from Quebec
Canadian television actresses
Canadian television directors
Canadian film actresses
Canadian women film directors
Canadian women television directors
Best Director Genie and Canadian Screen Award winners
Film directors from Quebec
Living people
People from Montérégie
Governor General's Performing Arts Award winners
Best Actress Genie and Canadian Screen Award winners
Prix Albert-Tessier winners